, officially , is a Ryūkyūan gusuku and was the largest in, and capital of, Nanzan until 1429. It is in ruins, and is located in Itoman.

History
Nanzan Castle was built in the early 14th century, and became capital of Nanzan in 1314 when the Lord of Ōzato, Ōzato Ofusato, broke away from the chieftain Tamagusuku at Urasoe Castle. It sat on a hill near the fishing town of Itoman and the farming village of Ōzato. There was a small inlet at the bottom of the hill that allowed merchant ships to trade directly with the castle. The strategic location of the castle allowed Nanzan to compete with Chūzan and outlive Hokuzan, but during a succession dispute in 1429 following the death of the last King of Nanzan, Ōzato Taromai, the army of Chūzan captured the castle. In the 1950s, a primary school was built within the inner court of the castle.

References

External links
http://blogs.yahoo.co.jp/drfcr421/24216370.html
https://web.archive.org/web/20140421051014/http://www.odnsym.com/pic/iseki/nanzan.html
https://web.archive.org/web/20140108225416/http://www.okipota.com/db02/history/ruin009/

Castles in Okinawa Prefecture